Shaxi is a town of 91,000 in southeastern Jiangsu province, People's Republic of China, located in the middle of Taicang City's jurisdiction. An ancient town with traditional architecture, Shaxi has a long history and a distinctive culture.

Origin

Yuan Dynasty
The history of Shaxi can be dated back to the Yuan Dynasty. According to historical records, around the time of the Dang Dynasty and the Song Dynasty, the town existed under a different name. After the time of the Yuan Dynasty, it started to be called Shaxi. It was also called Qipu due to its proximity to the lake.

Ming Dynasty
Starting in the Koji years of the Ming Dynasty, the town became more and more prosperous. Many high ranking court ministers chose Shaxi as the site to build their mansions. Thank to this, the streets and allies boomed and became busy day and night.

Ming and Qing Dynasty
At the time of the Ming and Qing Dynasties, foreign culture and technology started to influence traditional life in Shaxi. With the development of business and commerce, numerous businesses sprung up in the streets, and they badly needed a designated place to carry on their various activities. Many constructions were built next to Qipu Lake and a stone bridge was built which crossed the lake. Since then, these unique constructions have become an essential part of the city.

Shaxi is also one of the important birthplaces of Chinese national industry and today it is the key industrial town in the region of Taicang. In Guang Xu, thirty-two years after the start of the Qing Dynasty, the first industrial textile plant of Jiangsu province was established in Shaxi.

City Features 

Shaxi, nicknamed "the second Zhouzhuang", has many feature unique to the town.

Water Construction 
The old residences, considered cultural heritages, date back to the Qing Dynasty. They sit at both sides of Qipu Lake, the whole length being approximately 1.5 kilometers. The window of these houses are interesting. Each pane has unique patterns, the only similarity being that they are all very delicate. There are stone steps leading from the houses to the river.  To conclude, the water mansions, which present the simple and elegant posture, are treasured cultural heritages.

Stone Arch Bridge 
In the old street, from east to west, there are three parallel old bridges built in Ming or Qing Dynasty across Qipu Lake. From the distance, we can see that the arch bridge combines with its shadow so that a circle is formed. In the river, several boats decorating by red lanterns are always casually floating with the wind. All the objects make the town seem more peaceful and harmonious.

Old Street 

Although we have come into the modern society, in Shaxi, an old street still remained almost perfect. The old street is parallel to the Qipu Lake and it is 1.5 kilometers long. At each side, the constructions display quaint and elegant style. Whether the roofs, the windows or the doors, they all have fine carved patterns. The space between houses and houses constitutes a long narrow lane.
In recent days, on account of the investigation by the town government, some bronze persons who have different gestures are standing in the street. Almost every tour group coming here will choose to take photos with these vivid bronze persons. Nowadays, this old street has become a symbol of Shaxi without doubt.

Scenic areas

Leyin Park

Derivation
Leyin Park was originally named Leyin Park. In classical Chinese, the word "隐" means "hermit". According to a professional book collector, Chenjian, in Taicang, this park had been a private park in the Yuan Dynasty. A hermit, Qun Xiaozhen, built the park and treated it as his own study. The park has now been rebuilt on the old site. In 1982, it was officially renamed "乐荫园".

View
Inside the park, most of the constructions are built beside the water. Rockery mountains, greenwoods, bamboo groves and lawns are here and there. The park is about 22.5 acres and the region of water covers an area of 5 acres. Across the main water, there is a lotus leaf bridge.

Olive Island 

In Shaxi, there is another scenic spot, a small island called Olive Island in the south. The name derives from the view seen from the sky: it is similar to an olive. The island is 1,350 meters long and covers an area of 13,500 square meters.

View
On the island, there is a well-known bridge named "Five-Dragon Bridge". The bridge also has a magic legend. It is said that in the past, residents held a grand Dragon Boat Competition. The God was touched by the people's spirit so he sent five dragons to the human's world to support this event. In order to commemorate the honour, the bridge was constructed. There are many old pavilions inside the island such as "listening tide pavilion". Another famous pavilion is called "Green Bamboo Pavilion". Beside the pavilion, many green bamboo shoots have been planted as well as various plants and flowers.

Famous People 
Many celebrities were born in Shaxi, influenced by its unique environment.

Specialties

Rou (扣肉) 
Rou is one of Shaxi's three treasures. It can be found in both small and large restaurants. Cooking a real Rou is a long process with many steps. The most important thing is to pick a suitable pork. Many traditional flavours are added along with oil.

Salty pig bone porridge

Salty pig bone porridge is another special dish in Shaxi. The porridge is sweet and warm, fragrant and catchy. It is known for increasing one's beauty, and is said to be popular among women. This dish contains a moderate amount of pig bones, red dates, preserved duck, egg yolk, fruit peelings, ginger, chopped spring onions, salt, chicken and a rice wine.

External links 
 https://web.archive.org/web/20160304065310/http://zwgk.taicang.gov.cn/sxz/art/2010/11/29/art_2679_20572.html
 https://web.archive.org/web/20120106064814/http://www.shaxi.gov.cn/index.aspx
http://www.sozhen.com/default/newsarticlecon_231_559.html
Here is a relatively concrete collection of special dishes in Shaxi.
The town government has hopes to convert Shaxi into a modernized town.

References

Township-level divisions of Suzhou
Taicang